Luis Ciges Martínez (10 May 1921 – 11 December 2002) was a Spanish film actor. He appeared in 140 films between 1958 and 2002. His father was Manuel Ciges.

Selected filmography

 Historias de Madrid (1958) - Bombero (uncredited)
 Entierro de un funcionario en primavera (1958) - García
 Molokai (1959) - (uncredited)
 La quiniela (1960) - Trabajador del Patronato de Apuestas (uncredited)
 Plácido (1961) - Pobre en casa de Helguera
 The Lovely Lola (1962) - Abogado (uncredited)
 Los farsantes (1963) - Justo
 Young Sánchez (1964) - El padre de Paco
 The Thief of Tibidabo (1965) - Peperone
 La chica del autostop (1965)
 Chimes at Midnight (1965) - (uncredited)
 La visita que no tocó el timbre (1965)
 Mañana será otro día (1967) - Marinero
 Dante no es únicamente severo (1967) - Lord Pordemás del cuento del cazador
 Cada vez que... (1968)
 El Baldiri de la costa (1968) - Trumpet
 Nocturne 29 (1968)
 Spain Again (1968) - Padre Jacinto
 Después del diluvio (1968)
 Ditirambo (1968) - Hombre en gimnasio
 Marquis de Sade: Justine (1969) - Manuel (uncredited)
 Los caballeros de 'La antorcha''' (1969)
 The Exquisite Cadaver (1969) - Funcionario
 El abogado, el alcalde y el notario (1969) - Remigio
 Long Live the Bride and Groom (1970) - Cura
 Aoom (1970) - Constantino
 Cabezas cortadas (1970) - Blind Beggar
 Metamorfosis (1970)
 El hombre oculto (1971) - Santos
 Four Candles for Garringo (1971) - Jim
 Tirarse al monte (1971)
 Pastel de sangre (1971) - El vagabundo (segment "La danza o las supervivencias afectivas")
 La liga no es cosa de hombres (1972) - Ayudante de Hans
 A House Without Boundaries (1972) - Dueño de la fonda
 Arizona Kid (1972) - (uncredited)
 Al diablo, con amor (1973) - Padre de Emilio
 Horror Rises from the Tomb (1973) - Alain 'Le Raté' - a thief
 Corazón solitario (1973) - Luciano
 Vengeance of the Zombies (1973) - MacMurdo
 La saga de los Drácula/ The Dracula Saga (1973) - Vendedor de libros de oraciones
 The Vampires Night Orgy (1973) - Godó
 El chulo (1974) - Doctor
 I Hate My Body (1974) - Herman Schmidt
 Vera, un cuento cruel (1974) - Cura
 Los fríos senderos del crimen (1974) - Rupert
 Los Ojos Azules de la Muneca Rota (1974) - René
 Grandeur nature (1974) - Spaniard at party (uncredited)
 No quiero perder la honra (1975) - Director de cine
 Night of the Seagulls (1975)
 Pim, pam, pum... ¡fuego! (1975) - Rosales
 The Killer is Not Alone (1975) - Detective 3
 De profesión: polígamo (1975) - Padre de María
 Kilma, reina de las amazonas (1976) - Professor
 El libro de buen amor II (1976) - Professor
 Who Can Kill a Child? (1976) - Enrique Amorós
 The Anchorite (1976) - Wiz-Buete
 Nosotros que fuimos tan felices (1976) - Villegas
 Voyage of the Damned (1976) - President Bru's Secretary (uncredited)
 El hombre que supo amar (1977) - Exorcista
 Hasta que el matrimonio nos separe (1977) - Señor en campo de fútbol
 Parranda (1977) - Hombre taberna Esquilacha
 Al fin solos, pero... (1977) - Ejecutivo
 Eva, limpia como los chorros del oro (1977) - Pescadero
 La playa vacía (1977) - Dionisio
 Esposa y amante (1977) - Manolo
 Acto de posesión (1977) - Conocido de Berta
 La Raulito en libertad (1977)
 Gusanos de seda (1977) - Cura pueblo
 La criatura (1977) - Luis
 Con mucho cariño (1977)
 ¡Susana quiere perder... eso! (1977) - Farmacéutico
 Las truchas (1978) - Militante de Cruz Roja
 Un hombre llamado Flor de Otoño (1978) - Guarda
 ¡Arriba Hazaña! (1978) - Hermano Ángel
 The Remains from the Shipwreck (1978) - Don Jorge
 Tatuaje (1978) - Bromuro
 El Huerto del Francés/ The Frenchman's Garden (1978) - Verdugo
 Borrasca (1978) - Sr. Pons
 La escopeta nacional (1978) - Segundo
 ¿Qué hace una chica como tú en un sitio como éste? (1978) - El Hombre del Bar
 Sentados al borde de la mañana con los pies colgando (1978) - Concejal
 La insólita y gloriosa hazaña del cipote de Archidona (1979) - Guardia
 La larga noche de los bastones blancos (1979) - Conductor Metro
 Arrebato (1979) - Portero
 La campanada (1980)
 El carnaval de las bestias/ Human Beasts (1980) - El Palanqueta
 The Cantabrians (1980) - Tulio Metelo
 Jalea real (1980) - Condestable
 Tú estás loco Briones (1981) - El Frac
 Gay Club (1981) - Menéndez
 National Heritage (1981) - Segundo
 Kargus (1981) - Don Florencio - el maestro
 Casta e pura (1981)
 Trágala, perro (1981) - Celador
 Un pasota con corbata (1982) - Governador civil
 Estoy en crisis (1982) - Hortelano
 Labyrinth of Passion (1982) - Drycleaner
 La colmena (1982) - Don Casimiro
 Valentina (1982) - Médico
 Nacional III (1982) - Segundo
 Sal gorda (1984) - Basilio
 Bajo en nicotina (1984) - Cañizares
 Sálvese quien pueda (1984) - (uncredited)
 El jardín secreto (1984) - Mariano
 La vaquilla (1985) - Barbero
 La reina del mate (1985) - Riaño
 Pharaoh's Court (La corte de Faraón) (1985) - Huete
 Hierro dulce (Sweet Iron) (1985)
 Matador (1986) - Guarda
 El orden cómico (1986) - Alfonso
 Hay que deshacer la casa (1986) - Cacharrero
 Madrid (1987) - Paco
 Así como habían sido (1987)
 Divinas palabras (1987)
 El bosque animado (1987) - Loco de Vos
 Moors and Christians (1987) - Ropero
 Sinatra (1988) - Lagarto
 Pasodoble (1988) - Fraile
 El aire de un crimen (1988)
 Amanece, que no es poco (1989) - Jimmy
 The Flight of the Dove (1989) - Columela
 Anything for Bread (1991) - José María
 La viuda del capitán Estrada (1991) - Maitre
 Everyone Off to Jail (1993) - Ludo
 Alegre ma non troppo (1994) - Abuelo
 Así en el cielo como en la tierra (1995) - Matacanes
 Una pareja perfecta (1998) - Partenio
 The Miracle of P. Tinto (1998) - P. Tinto
 Paris-Timbuktu (París-Tombuctú) (1999) - Bahamonde
 La mujer más fea del mundo (1999) - El anciano vicioso
 El paraíso ya no es lo que era (2001) - Luis
 No debes estar aquí (2002) - Ayudante Biblioteca
 Mortadelo & Filemon: The Big Adventure (2003) - Ingeniero en cemento

Television

 Don Juan (1 June 1974)
 El Pícaro (1974)
 Capítulo 10: De cómo todos los caminos no dan a Roma pero sí los allana el dinero.
 Poesía de amor y muerte (13 February 1976)
 Los Pintores del Prado (1974)
 Cuentos y leyendas Un error judicial (17 December 1974)       
 En provincia (26 September 1975)  
 La puñalada (24 October 1975)  
 Huida hacia el pueblo de las muñecas de cera (7 November 1975)    
 El libro de los tesoros (5 December 1975)      
 La inocencia castigada (26 December 1975)      
 El regreso de Edelmiro (9 January 1976)
 Los Libros Viaje a La Alcarria (5 April 1976)
 Curro Jiménez En la loca fortuna (16 March 1977)
 El péndulo (12 June 1977)
 Escrito en América  Cadáveres para la publicidad (9 September 1979)
 El español y los siete pecados capitales La envidia (21 November 1980) 
 Fortunata y Jacinta (1980)
 Juanita la Larga (1982)
 La huella del crimen El crimen de la calle Fuencarral (17 May 1985)
 Las aventuras de Pepe Carvalho El mar, un cristal opaco (14 March 1986)
 Escalera interior, escalera exterior (1986)
 La mujer de tu vida La mujer infiel (2 March 1990)
 Truhanes La tontina (26 October 1993)
 Farmacia de guardia (1991-1994)
 Médico de familia Blanca y radiante (23 December 1997)      
 Periodistas Verano.es (30 June 2000)       
 Compañeros''
 Se acabó la vida de artista (3 October 2000)

External links

1921 births
2002 deaths
Spanish male film actors
Male actors from Madrid
20th-century Spanish male actors
Best Supporting Actor Goya Award winners